Magic was the first album by the funk band T-Connection. The album was released in 1977.

Track listing 
All tracks composed by Theophilus Coakley; except where noted.
 "Do What Ya Wanna Do" (7:15) 
 "Disco Magic" (Theophilus Coakley, Cory Wade) - (7:15)
 "Go Back Home" (3:45) 
 "Got to See My Lady" (4:30) 
 "Crazy Mixed Up World" (3:15) 
 "Mothers Love" (3:30) 
 "Monday Morning" (3:15) 
 "Peace Line" (5:05)

Personnel
T-Connection
Theophilus Coakley - lead vocals, keyboards, backing vocals
Monty Brown - guitar, backing vocals
Kirkwood Coakley - bass guitar, backing vocals
Berkley Van Byrd - drums, backing vocals
Anthony "Monks" Flowers - percussion, backing vocals
Source: http://www.discogs.com

1977 debut albums
T-Connection albums
albums produced by Alex Sadkin